Claassenia is a genus of common stoneflies in the family Perlidae. There are about 12 described species in Claassenia.

Species
These 12 species belong to the genus Claassenia:

 Claassenia bischoffi (Wu, 1935)
 Claassenia brachyptera Brinck, 1954
 Claassenia caudata (Klapálek, 1916)
 Claassenia drukpa Stark & Sivec, 2010
 Claassenia fulva Wu, 1973
 Claassenia gigas (Klapálek, 1916)
 Claassenia longistyla Wu, 1973
 Claassenia magna Wu, 1948
 Claassenia radiata (Klapálek, 1916)
 Claassenia sabulosa (Banks, 1900) (short-wing stone)
 Claassenia semibrachyptera Wu & Claassen, 1934
 Claassenia tincta (Navás, 1923)

References

Further reading

 
 

Perlidae
Articles created by Qbugbot